Romantic Comedy is a 2010 Turkish romantic comedy film, directed by Ketche, about three close friends who live very different lives.

Production
The film was shot on location in Istanbul, Turkey.

Plot
Esra, Didem and Zeynep are three close friends who live together, but have very different lives, When Zeynep gets married, Esra decides to get away from her job and begin a new life. She gets a job at an advertising company. She becomes interested in the company's Creative Director Mert, while Didem becomes interested in Mert's close friend Cem, who is an actor.

Cast
Sedef Avcı as Esra
Sinem Kobal as Didem
Burcu Kara as Zeynep
Cemal Hünal as Mert
Engin Altan as Cem
Begüm Kütük as Ece
Gürgen Öz as Yiğit

Release

Reception
The film has made a total gross of $3,974,799.

References

External links
 http://www.romantikkomedi.com

2010 films
2010s Turkish-language films
2010 romantic comedy films
Films set in Turkey
Films set in Istanbul
Turkish romantic comedy films